North American describes any entity, people, group, or attribute of North America, especially of the United States and Canada together.

North American or North America may also refer to:

Culture
North American English, all American English and Canadian English dialects

Institutions

 North American Aviation, Inc., an aircraft manufacturer from 1928 to 1967
 North American Company, a former holding company for public utilities broken up in the 1940s
 North American Airlines, an airline based in New York, NY
 North American Division of Seventh-day Adventists, a subdivision of the Adventist World Church comprising the United States, Canada and Bermuda

Media
 North America (TV series), American miniseries
 North America: Growth of a Continent, Canadian miniseries
 The North American, American newspaper published 1839 to 1925
 North American Review, American literary magazine
 North America, a box office territory comprising the United States and Canada

Other
 SS North American, steamship built in 1913

See also
 Northern American (disambiguation)
 Northern America (disambiguation)
 Northern United States